Andy Kirk (born October 3, 1977) is a retired American soccer goalkeeper who spent three seasons in Major League Soccer.  He was also a member of the United States U-17 men's national soccer team at the 1993 FIFA U-17 World Championship and the United States U-20 men's national soccer team at the 1997 FIFA World Youth Championship.

Youth
Kirk graduated from Marquette University High School where he was a Gatorade High School Soccer Player of the Year.  He then attended the University of Maryland, College Park where he spent two seasons with the men's soccer team.  In January 1998, he announced his intention to leave the team in order to pursue a professional career.

Professional
He signed with MLS Project 40.  He spent time with both the Pro-40 team as well as playing nine games with the Clash.  On January 27, 1999, the Clash sent Kirk to the Tampa Bay Mutiny in exchange for a second round selection in the 2000 MLS SuperDraft.  He played six games in 1999, but none in 2000.  Following the season, he decided to retire.

He returned to the University of Maryland where he gained a bachelor's degree in finance.  He then became an accountant with Rydex Investments.

National team
In 1993, he was a member of the United States U-17 men's national soccer team which competed at the 1993 FIFA U-17 World Championship.  However, Kirk never entered a game as he backed up Jon Busch.  In 1997, Kirk was called into the United States U-20 men's national soccer team.  He played nineteen games, four at the 1997 FIFA World Youth Championship that year.

He served for one year at Maryland.

References

External links

Soccertimes.com Player Profile

1977 births
Living people
Soccer players from Milwaukee
American soccer players
Association football goalkeepers
Maryland Terrapins men's soccer players
San Jose Earthquakes players
MLS Pro-40 players
Tampa Bay Mutiny players
Major League Soccer players
United States men's youth international soccer players
United States men's under-20 international soccer players